The following is a list of the 19 cantons of the Doubs department, in France, following the French canton reorganisation which came into effect in March 2015:

 Audincourt
 Baume-les-Dames
 Bavans
 Besançon-1
 Besançon-2
 Besançon-3
 Besançon-4
 Besançon-5
 Besançon-6
 Bethoncourt
 Frasne
 Maîche
 Montbéliard
 Morteau
 Ornans
 Pontarlier
 Saint-Vit
 Valdahon
 Valentigney

References